Keith Burns (born 25 November 1939) is a former Australian rules footballer who played for Collingwood in the Victorian Football League (VFL).

Burns, a rover, was recruited to Collingwood from Preston. He kicked 25 goals in 1960, three of them in a match winning performance against Fitzroy in the Preliminary Final. Burns was then in the forward pocket when Collingwood were comprehensively beaten by Melbourne in the Grand Final.

He joined Sandringham in 1962 and won the J. J. Liston Trophy that season. Burns however missed the Grand Final, where Sandringham beat Moorabbin by a single point. He captained the Victorian Football Association in the 1966 Hobart Carnival, by which time he had become captain-coach of Brunswick. Burns later coached Collingwood's Under-19s football team.

References  

Holmesby, Russell and Main, Jim (2007). The Encyclopedia of AFL Footballers. 7th ed. Melbourne: Bas Publishing.

1939 births
Australian rules footballers from Victoria (Australia)
Collingwood Football Club players
J. J. Liston Trophy winners
Sandringham Football Club players
Brunswick Football Club players
Brunswick Football Club coaches
Living people